The Man in the High Castle (1962), by Philip K. Dick, is an alternative history novel wherein the Axis Powers won World War II. The story occurs in 1962, fifteen years after the end of the war in 1947, and depicts the political intrigues between Imperial Japan and Nazi Germany as they rule the partitioned United States. The titular character is the author of a novel-within-the-novel entitled The Grasshopper Lies Heavy, itself also an alternative history of the war.

Dick's thematic inspirations include the alternative history of the American Civil War, Bring the Jubilee (1953), by Ward Moore, and the I Ching, a Chinese book of divination that features in the story and the actions of the characters. The Man in the High Castle won the Hugo Award for Best Novel in 1963, and was adapted to television for Amazon Prime Video as The Man in the High Castle in 2015.

Synopsis

Background

In The Man in the High Castle alternative history, Giuseppe Zangara successfully assassinates President-elect Franklin D. Roosevelt in 1933, resulting in the continuation of the Great Depression and the policy of United States non-interventionism at the start of World War II in 1939. American inaction allows Nazi Germany to conquer and annex continental Europe and the Soviet Union into the Greater Germanic Reich. The exterminations of the Jews, the Romani people, the Slavs, homosexuals, and all other peoples whom the Nazis considered subhuman ensued. The Axis powers then jointly conquered Africa. Imperial Japan expanded its colonial empire with occupations of eastern Asia and Oceania, and invaded the West Coast of the United States, while Nazi Germany invaded the East Coast; the surrender of the Allies ended World War II in 1947.

By the 1960s, Imperial Japan and Nazi Germany are the world's superpowers, fighting a geopolitical cold war over the former United States. Japan extended the Greater East Asia Co-Prosperity Sphere with the establishment of the Pacific States of America (PSA), with the politically neutral Rocky Mountain States acting as a buffer with the Nazi states to the east. Nazi North America is composed of two countries: The South, which is ruled by a collaborationist pro-Nazi puppet regime; and  the North, which is the United States of America, ruled by a Nazi military governor. Moreover, Canada remains an independent country, despite having been one of the anti-Nazi Allies in the lost war.

The aged Hitler is incapacitated by tertiary syphilis, Martin Bormann is the acting Chancellor of Germany, and the inner-circle Nazis—Joseph Goebbels, Reinhard Heydrich, Hermann Göring, Arthur Seyss-Inquart—vie to succeed Hitler as the Führer of the Greater Germanic Reich. Technologically, the Nazis have drained the Mediterranean Sea for lebensraum and farmland, developed and used the hydrogen bomb, developed rockets for travelling throughout the world and into outer space, such as the colonization missions to the Moon, and to the planets Venus and Mars.

Plot
The principal setting of The Man in the High Castle is the city of San Francisco in the Pacific States of America, where Japanese judicial racism has enslaved black people and reduced the Chinese residents to second-class citizens; secondary settings are in the Rocky Mountain States. In 1962, fifteen years after Imperial Japan and Nazi Germany won World War II, in the Pacific States of America, the businessman Robert Childan owns an antiques shop that specializes in Americana for a Japanese clientele who fetishize cultural artifacts of the former United States. One day, Childan receives a request from Nobusuke Tagomi, a high-ranking trade official, who seeks a gift to impress a Swedish industrialist named Baynes. In fact, Childan can readily fulfill Tagomi's request because the shop is well-stocked with counterfeit antiques made by the metal works Wyndam-Matson Corporation.

Recently fired from his job at a Wyndam-Matson factory in San Francisco, Frank Frink (formerly Fink) is a secret Jew and war veteran who agrees to join a former co-worker to start a business making and selling jewelry. Meanwhile, in the Rocky Mountain States, Frank's ex-wife, Juliana Frink, works as a judo instructor in Canon City, Colorado, and, in her private life, has entered a sexual relationship with Joe Cinnadella, an Italian truck driver and ex-soldier. Throughout the story, the characters make important decisions based upon their interpretations of prophetic messages from the I Ching, a Chinese book of divination. Some characters also secretly read The Grasshopper Lies Heavy, a novel of speculative fiction that presents an alternative history of World War II, wherein the Allies defeat the Axis. The Nazis ban the novel in the United States, but the Japanese allow its publication and sale in the Pacific States of America.

Threatening to expose the Wyndam-Matson Corporation's supplying counterfeit antiques to Childan, Frink blackmails Wyndam-Matson for money to finance his jewelry business. Tagomi and Baynes meet, but Baynes repeatedly delays conducting any real business because he awaits a third party from Japan. Suddenly, the Nazi news media inform the public of the death of the Chancellor of Nazi Germany, Martin Bormann, after a short illness. Childan takes some of Frink's "authentic metalwork" jewelry on consignment, to curry favor with a Japanese client, who, to Childan's surprise, says that the jewelry possesses much Wu, spiritual awareness. Juliana and Joe travel by road to Denver, Colorado, but en route Joe impulsively decides that they take a side trip to Cheyenne, Wyoming, to meet Hawthorne Abendsen, the mysterious author of The Grasshopper Lies Heavy; supposedly, Abendsen lives in a guarded estate named the High Castle. Suddenly, the Nazi news media inform the public that Joseph Goebbels is the new Chancellor of Nazi Germany.

After much delay, Baynes and Tagomi meet their Japanese contact, while the Sicherheitsdienst (SD), the Nazi security service, is close to arresting Baynes because he actually is Rudolf Wegener, a Nazi defector. Baynes warns his contact, a Japanese general, of the existence of Operation Dandelion, a plan of Goebbels for a Nazi sneak attack upon the Japanese Home Islands, with the goal of definitively destroying the Empire of Japan. Frink is exposed as a crypto-Jew and arrested by the San Francisco police. Elsewhere, two SD agents confront Baynes and Tagomi, who uses his antique American pistol to kill both agents. In Colorado, Joe abruptly changes his appearance and mannerisms before the side trip to the High Castle in Wyoming; Juliana infers that Joe intends to assassinate Abendsen. Joe reveals himself to be a Swiss Nazi when he confirms his intention; Juliana mortally wounds Joe and goes to warn Abendsen.

Wegener flies back to Germany and learns that Reinhard Heydrich (a member of the faction against Operation Dandelion) has launched a coup d’état against Goebbels, to install himself as Chancellor of Nazi Germany. Tagomi is emotionally shaken by having killed the SD agents and later goes to the antiques shop to sell back the pistol to Childan; instead, sensing the spiritual energy from one of Frink's jewelry creations, Tagomi impulsively buys the jewelry. Tagomi then undergoes an intense spiritual experience during which he momentarily perceives an alternative version of San Francisco, evidenced by the Embarcadero freeway, which Tagomi has never seen and by the fact that white people do not defer to Japanese people.

Tagomi later meets with the German consul in San Francisco and compels the Germans to free Frink, whom Tagomi has never met, by refusing to sign the order of extradition to Nazi Germany. Juliana has a spiritual experience when she arrives in Cheyenne. She discovers that Abendsen lives with his family in a normal house, having abandoned the High Castle because of a changed outlook on life; thus the possibility of being assassinated no longer worries him. After evading Juliana's questions about his literary inspiration, Abendsen says that he used the I Ching to guide his writing of The Grasshopper Lies Heavy. Before leaving, Juliana infers then that Truth wrote the novel to reveal the Inner Truth that Imperial Japan and Nazi Germany did lose World War II in 1945.

The Grasshopper Lies Heavy
Several characters in The Man in the High Castle read the popular novel The Grasshopper Lies Heavy, by Hawthorne Abendsen, which title the readers presume derives from The Bible verse fragment: "The grasshopper shall be a burden". As an alternative history of the Second World War, wherein the Allies defeat the Axis Powers, the Nazi regime bans The Grasshopper Lies Heavy in the South, whereas the Pacific States of America do allow the publication and sale of the Abensen's counterfactual novel.

The Grasshopper Lies Heavy postulates that President Roosevelt survives the 1933 assassination attempt but chooses not to seek re-election in 1940. The next president, Rexford Tugwell, moves the American Pacific Fleet from Pearl Harbor, Hawaii, saving it from attack by the Imperial Japanese Navy, which ensures that the country is better equipped to fight the war. Having retained most of their military-industrial capabilities, the United Kingdom contributes more to the Allied war effort, which facilitates the defeat of Field Marshal Erwin Rommel in the North African Campaign. The British fight the Axis armies through the Caucasus to join the Soviet Union and defeat the Nazis in the Battle of Stalingrad; the Kingdom of Italy and the Kingdom of Hungary each renege their membership in the Axis and betray the Nazis; the British Army joins the Red Army in the Battle of Berlin, the decisive defeat of Nazi Germany. At war's end in 1945, Hitler and the Nazi leaders are tried as war criminals and are put to death, with Hitler's last words being Deutsche, hier steh' ich ("Germans, here I stand"), in imitation of Martin Luther.

After the war, Tugwell promulgates the New Deal for the countries of the world, which finances a decade of rebuilding in China and the education of illiterate peoples in the undeveloped countries of Africa and Asia, who receive television sets by which they are taught to read and write, are instructed in digging wells and in purifying water. The New Deal financial assistance facilitates American businesses building factories in the undeveloped countries of Asia and Africa. American society is peaceful and harmonious and is at peace with the other countries of the world; the war ends the Soviet Union. Ten years after the war, still headed by Winston Churchill, the British Empire becomes militaristic, anti-American and establishes prison camps in India for Chinese subjects considered disloyal. Suspecting that the United States is sponsoring the anti-colonial subversion of British colonial rule in Asia, Churchill provokes a cold war for global hegemony; the geopolitical rivalry leads to an Anglo–American war won by the United Kingdom.

Inspirations
The novelist Philip K. Dick said that he imagined the story of The Man in the High Castle (1962) from his reading of the novel Bring the Jubilee (1953), by Ward Moore, which is an alternative history of the U.S. civil war won by the Confederacy. In the acknowledgements page of The Man in the High Castle, Dick mentions the thematic influences of the popular history The Rise and Fall of the Third Reich: A History of Nazi Germany (1960), by William L. Shirer; the biography Hitler: A Study in Tyranny (1952), by Alan Bullock; The Goebbels Diaries (1948); Foxes of the Desert (1960), by Paul Carrell; and the 1950 translation of the I Ching, by Richard Wilhelm. As a novelist, P. K. Dick used the I Ching to craft the themes, plot and story of The Man in the High Castle, whose characters also use the I Ching to inform and guide their decisions.

Dick cites the thematic influences of Japanese and Tibetan poetry upon the narrative of The Man in the High Castle; (i) The haiku in page 48 of the novel is from the first volume of the Anthology of Japanese Literature (1955), edited by Donald Keene; (ii) the waka poem in page 135 is from Zen and Japanese Culture (1955), by D. T. Suzuki and (iii) the Tibetan book of the dead, the Bardo Thodol (1960), edited by Walter Evans-Wentz and mentions the sociologic influences of the expressionist novella Miss Lonelyhearts (1933), by Nathanael West, in which an unhappy newspaper reporter pseudonymously writes the "Miss Lonelyhearts" advice column, through which he dispenses advice to emotionally forlorn readers during the Great Depression. Despite his job as Miss Lonelyhearts, the reporter seeks consolation in religion, sexual promiscuity, rural vacations and much work; no activity provides him with a sense of personal authenticity derived from his intellectual and emotional engagement with the world.

Reception
Avram Davidson praised the novel as a "superior work of fiction", citing Dick's use of the I Ching as "fascinating". Davidson concluded that "It's all here—extrapolation, suspense, action, art, philosophy, plot, [and] character". The Man in the High Castle secured for Dick the 1963 Hugo Award for Best Novel. In a review of a paperback reprint of the novel, Robert Silverberg wrote in Amazing Stories magazine, "Dick's prose crackles with excitement, his characters are vividly real, his plot is stunning".

In The Religion of Science Fiction, Frederick A. Kreuziger explores the theory of history implied by Dick's creation of the two alternative realities

Neither of the two worlds, however, the revised version of the outcome of WWII nor the fictional account of our present world, is anywhere near similar to the world we are familiar with. But they could be! This is what the book is about. The book argues that this world, described twice, although differently each time, is exactly the world we know and are familiar with. Indeed, it is the only world we know: the world of chance, luck, fate.

In her introduction to the Folio Society edition of the novel, Ursula K. Le Guin writes that The Man in the High Castle “may be the first, big lasting contribution science fiction made to American literature.”

Adaptations

Audiobook
An unabridged The Man in the High Castle audiobook, read by George Guidall and running approximately 9.5 hours over seven audio cassettes, was released in 1997. Another unabridged audiobook version was released in 2008 by Blackstone Audio, read by Tom Wyner (credited as Tom Weiner) and running approximately 8.5 hours over seven CDs. A third unabridged audiobook recording was released in 2014 by Brilliance Audio, read by Jeff Cummings with a running time of 9 hours 58 minutes.

Television

After a number of attempts to adapt the book to the screen, in October 2014, Amazon's film production unit began filming the pilot episode of The Man in the High Castle in Roslyn, Washington, for release through the Amazon Prime Web video streaming service. The pilot episode was released by Amazon Studios on January 15, 2015, and was Amazon's "most watched pilot ever" according to Amazon Studios' vice president, Roy Price. On February 18, 2015, Amazon green-lit the series. The show became available for streaming on November 20, 2015.

Incomplete sequel
In a 1976 interview, Dick said he planned to write a sequel novel to The Man in the High Castle: "And so there's no real ending on it. I like to regard it as an open ending. It will segue into a sequel sometime." Dick said that he had "started several times to write a sequel" but progressed little, because he was too disturbed by his original research for The Man in the High Castle and could not mentally bear "to go back and read about Nazis again". He suggested that the sequel would be a collaboration with another author:Somebody would have to come in and help me do a sequel to it. Someone who had the stomach for the stamina to think along those lines, to get into the head; if you're going to start writing about Reinhard Heydrich, for instance, you have to get into his face. Can you imagine getting into Reinhard Heydrich's face?

Two chapters of the proposed sequel were published in The Shifting Realities of Philip K. Dick, a collection of his essays and other writings. Eventually, Dick admitted that the proposed sequel became an unrelated novel, The Ganymede Takeover, co-written with Ray Nelson (known for writing the short story filmed as They Live).

Dick's novel Radio Free Albemuth is rumored to have started as a sequel to The Man in the High Castle. Dick described the plot of this early version of Radio Free Albemuth—then titled VALISystem A—writing:... a divine and loving ETI [extraterrestrial intelligence] ... help[s] Hawthorne Abendsen, the protagonist-author in [The Man in the High Castle], continue on in his difficult life after the Nazi secret police finally got to him ... VALISystem A, located in deep space, sees to it that nothing can prevent Abendsen from finishing his novel.

The novel eventually became a new story unrelated to The Man in the High Castle. Dick ultimately abandoned the Albemuth book, unpublished during his lifetime, though portions were salvaged and used for 1981's VALIS. Radio Free Albemuth was published in 1985, three years after Dick's death.

See also

Fatherland (novel)
Hypothetical Axis victory in World War II
Simulated reality in fiction

References

Further reading

Brown, William Lansing. 2006. "alternative Histories: Power, Politics, and Paranoia in Philip Roth's The Plot against America and Philip K. Dick's The Man in the High Castle", The Image of Power in Literature, Media, and Society: Selected Papers, 2006 Conference, Society for the Interdisciplinary Study of Social Imagery. Wright, Will; Kaplan, Steven (eds.); Pueblo, CO: Society for the Interdisciplinary Study of Social Imagery, Colorado State University-Pueblo; pp. 107–11.
Campbell, Laura E. 1992. "Dickian Time in The Man in the High Castle", Extrapolation, 33: 3, pp. 190–201.
Carter, Cassie, 1995. "The Metacolonization of Dick's The Man in the High Castle: Mimicry, Parasitism and Americanism in the PSA", Science Fiction Studies #67, 22:3, pp. 333–342.
DiTommaso, Lorenzo, 1999. "Redemption in Philip K. Dick's The Man in the High Castle", Science Fiction Studies # 77, 26:, pp. 91–119, DePauw University.
Fofi, Goffredo 1997. "Postfazione", Philip K. Dick, La Svastica sul Sole, Roma, Fanucci, pp. 391–5.
Hayles, N. Katherine 1983. "Metaphysics and Metafiction in The Man in the High Castle", Philip K. Dick. Greenberg, M.H.; Olander, J.D. (eds.); New York: Taplinger, 1983, pp. 53–71.
Malmgren, Carl D. 1980. "Philip Dick's The Man in the High Castle and the Nature of Science Fictional Worlds", Bridges to Science Fiction. Slusser, George E.; Guffey, George R.; Rose, Mark (eds.); Carbondale and Edwardsville: Southern Illinois University Press, pp. 120–30.
Mountfort, Paul 2016. "The I Ching and Philip K. Dick's The Man in the High Castle", Science-Fiction Studies # 129, 43:, pp. 287–309.
Pagetti, Carlo, 2001a. "La svastica americana" [Introduction], Philip K. Dick, L'uomo nell'alto castello, Roma: Fanucci, pp. 7–26.
Proietti, Salvatore, 1989. "The Man in The High Castle: politica e metaromanzo", Il sogno dei simulacri. Pagetti, Carlo; Viviani, Gianfranco (eds.); Milano: Nord, 1989 pp. 34–41.
Rieder, John 1988. "The Metafictive World of The Man in the High Castle: Hermeneutics, Ethics, and Political Ideology", Science-Fiction Studies # 45, 15.2: 214–25.
Rossi, Umberto, 2000. "All Around the High Castle: Narrative Voices and Fictional Visions in Philip K. Dick's The Man in the High Castle", Telling the Stories of America — History, Literature and the Arts — Proceedings of the 14th AISNA Biennial conference (Pescara, 1997), Clericuzio, A.; Goldoni, Annalisa; Mariani, Andrea (eds.); Roma: Nuova Arnica, pp. 474–83.
Simons, John L. 1985. "The Power of Small Things in Philip K. Dick's The Man in the High Castle". The Rocky Mountain Review of Language and Literature, 39:4, pp. 261–75.
Warrick, Patricia, 1992. "The Encounter of Taoism and Fascism in The Man in the High Castle", On Philip K. Dick, Mullen et al. (eds.); Terre Haute and Greencastle: SF-TH Inc. 1992, pp. 27–52.

External links
The Man in the High Castle cover art gallery

The Man in the High Castle at Worlds Without End

1962 American novels
1962 science fiction novels
Fiction set in 1962
Novels set in the 1960s
American alternate history novels
Dystopian novels
Hugo Award for Best Novel-winning works
Metafictional novels
Postmodern novels
Novels by Philip K. Dick
Novels set in California
Novels set in San Francisco
Novels about World War II alternate histories
G. P. Putnam's Sons books
American novels adapted into television shows
Alternate Nazi Germany novels
Novels set in fictional countries